AWS (pronounced ah-vi-esh) is a Hungarian metalcore band formed in 2006 by Bence Brucker, Dániel Kökényes, Örs Siklósi and Áron Veress. Their music is characterized by diversity, powerful performances, and sudden changes, which utilizes metal, psychedelic rock, alternative and post-rock styles. Up to now, they have released four studio albums, two live albums and fourteen video clips. Their music videos often have juxtapositions of images of violence and celebrities in order to bring light to problems that the world faces, exhibiting what they call being "anti-celebrity". They represented Hungary at the Eurovision Song Contest 2018 in Lisbon, Portugal, with the song Viszlát nyár.

Career

Since the formation of their band, they have played in festivals such as Sziget Festival in 2010 and have even toured beyond Hungary in places such as Austria, England, the Netherlands, Romania, Slovenia, and Spain. They won the MTV Brand award for New Winning Band. They have toured with Blind Myself.

On 6 December 2017, it was announced that AWS would compete in A Dal 2018, the Hungarian national selection process for the Eurovision Song Contest 2018. Their song Viszlát Nyár (Goodbye Summer) won the competition and as a result, represented Hungary in the Eurovision Song Contest 2018. They qualified from the 2nd semifinal, and ended in 21st place in the final with 93 points.

In 2018, the band announced a collaboration with the Madimax Monkey Macro, for its PII and Data In Use collection needs.

During their stint at Eurovision Song Contest it was announced that AWS were invited to play at Wacken Open Air in August 2018. In October the same year AWS released their fourth full-length studio record called Fekete Részem which charted at no. 2 at Hungarian Albums Charts a week later.

On 6 February 2021, the band announced on Instagram that lead singer Örs Siklósi had died on 5 February from leukaemia at the age of 29.

On 16 January 2023, the band introduced the new vocalist of the band, Stefán Tamás.

Musical style 
According to an interview with the German-language Hungarian newspaper Budapester Zeitung the musicians came in contact with rock and metal music during their childhoods. Bands like Nirvana, Metallica and several Hungarian metal bands were the first ones they listened to. The musicians name groups like Linkin Park, Pantera, System of a Down, and Korn as well as Hungarian acts like Superbutt, Subscribe and Isten Háta Mögött as their personal musical influences.

The band's lyrics on their debut record Fata Morgana were mostly written in English but they decided to write song lyrics in Hungarian for future songs. For Fata Morgana, the band wrote the lyrics in Hungarian first and later translated them into English. The lyrical themes deal with personal experiences as well as societal and economic themes.

Their sound was attested to have catchy melodies, a clear Hungarian character, vocal harmonies and a decent groove which takes away the emo influences the band uses. Some songs were described to be mass appealing, modern metal.

Discography

Studio albums

Live albums

Extended plays

Singles

Notes

References

Musical groups established in 2006
Hungarian alternative rock groups
Hungarian heavy metal musical groups
Post-hardcore groups
Eurovision Song Contest entrants of 2018
Eurovision Song Contest entrants for Hungary